Milo Edwards is a comedian, podcaster and writer. He is cohost of the podcasts Trashfuture, Masters of Our Domain and Toomuch (Тумач) . He has performed comedy in both English and in Russian including on the Russian TV shows Open Microphone and StandUp. He has been a comedy writer for Late Night Mash, Mock The Week, Hello America, Breaking The News and The News Quiz and has written for Private Eye and The New Statesman.

Comedy 
Edwards was a member of the Footlights at the University of Cambridge. In 2015 he moved to Russia where he performed on Open Microphone (Открытый Микрофон) and StandUp on the Russian TV channel TNT Television (ТНТ). In 2018 he moved back to the UK and in 2019 performed his show Pindos at Edinburgh Fringe about his time working as a comedian in Russia.

Podcasting 
Edwards is a cohost of TrashFuture "a podcast about business success and making yourself smarter with the continued psychic trauma of capitalism" with Hussein Kesvani, Alice Caldwell-Kelly, Nate Bethea and Riley Quinn. He also cohosts with Phoebe Roy Masters of our Domain, a podcast about Seinfeld as well as the Russian language comedy podcast Toomuch (Тумач) .

Writing 
Edwards has been a comedy writer for Late Night Mash, Mock The Week, Hello America, Breaking The News and The News Quiz. He has written for Private Eye and The New Statesman.

References 

Alumni of Peterhouse, Cambridge
British comedians
British writers
British podcasters
Living people
Year of birth missing (living people)